Robert Edwy Ryerson (12 August 1865 – 12 October 1958) was a Conservative member of the House of Commons of Canada. He was born in Brant County, Canada West and became a grocer and merchant.

Ryerson attended public school at Brantford. He became an associate manager of grocery firm Ryerson Brothers and served three terms as a Brantford alderman.

He was first elected to Parliament at the Brantford City riding in the 1925 general election and re-elected there in 1926 and 1930. Ryerson was defeated in the 1935 federal election by William Ross Macdonald of the Liberal party.

References

External links
 

1865 births
1958 deaths
Canadian merchants
Canadian grocers
Conservative Party of Canada (1867–1942) MPs
Members of the House of Commons of Canada from Ontario